Martindale may refer to:

People
 Adam Martindale (1623–1686), leading 17th century English Presbyterian minister
 Billy Martindale (born 1938), American golfer
 C. C. Martindale (1879–1963), English priest and writer
 David Martindale (born 1974), Scottish football manager
 Doug Martindale (born 1947), Canadian politician
 Elijah Martindale (1793–1874), American pioneer
 Frederick C. Martindale (1865–1928), American politician
 Henry C. Martindale (1780–1860), Congressman from New York
 James B. Martindale (1836–1904), American attorney
 John H. Martindale (1815–1881), Union general
 John Robert Martindale (born 1935), English historian 
 Ken Martindale (1932–2015), British businessman
 Louisa Martindale (1872–1966), British surgeon
 Louisa Martindale (feminist) (1839–1914), British activist for women's rights
 Manny Martindale (1909–1972), West Indian cricketer
 Margo Martindale (born 1951), American character actress
 Miss Martindale, disciplinarian, columnist, and author, representative of Aristasia
 Wallace Smith Martindale III, (born 1930), American mathematician
 William Martindale (1840–1902), pharmacist and founding editor of Martindale: The Extra Pharmacopoeia
 Wink Martindale (born 1933), game show host

Places
Martindale, Cumbria, England
Martindale Heights, St. Catharines, Ontario
Martindale, Pennsylvania
Martindale, Texas
Martindale, Washington
Martindale, Calgary, a neighbourhood
Martindale station, a C-Train station in the neighbourhood
Martindale, Eastern Cape, a farming community near Bathurst in South Africa
Martindale (NYCRR station), a former railway station in Hillsdale, New York
Martindale Hall a Georgian-style mansion near Mintaro, South Australia on the site of Martindale sheep station

Science
Martindale (unit), unit for measuring abrasion resistance of textiles

Publications
 Martindale: The Complete Drug Reference, a medicines information resource
 LexisNexis Martindale-Hubbell (commonly referred to as Martindale-Hubbell), a catalogue of lawyers in the United States